Nardella is an Italian surname. Notable people with the surname include:

 Bob Nardella (born 1968), Italian-American former professional ice hockey defenseman 
 Dario Nardella (born 1975), Italian politician 
 Donato Antonio "Don" Nardella (born 1958), Australian politician
 Jena Lee Nardella (born 1982), American author, writer and activist
 Steve Nardella (born 1948), American guitarist 

Italian-language surnames